Təzəkənd (also, Tazakend) is a village and municipality in the Agdam Rayon of Azerbaijan.  It has a population of 3,659.  The municipality consists of the villages of Təzəkənd, Birinci Dördyol, İkinci Dördyol.

References 

Populated places in Aghdam District